Phoebus (also known as Apollo) is one of the Olympian deities in Greek and Roman mythology. The name is often used as a poetic term for the Sun.

Phoebus may also refer to:

People

Given name
 Francis Phoebus of Navarre (c. 1469-1483), king of Navarre
 Phoebus (songwriter) (born 1971), Greek composer
 Phoebus Levene (1869-1940), American biochemist
 Phoebus of Lusignan (15th century), Marshal of Armenia

Surname
 Gaston Phoebus (14th century), 11th count of Foix
 Harrison Phoebus (1840–1886), American entrepreneur
 Samuel ben Uri Shraga Phoebus (17th century), Polish rabbi
 Tom Phoebus (born 1942), starting pitcher in Major League Baseball

Other uses
 Phoebus (lichen), a genus of fungus
 Phoebus (planet), a fictional planet in the computer game Exile
 Phoebus, Virginia, United States
 Phoebus cartel, a cartel that existed to control the manufacture and sale of light bulbs
 Phoebus High School, Hampton, Virginia, United States
 Bölkow Phoebus, an early glass-fibre glider made by Bölkow GmbH, Germany in the 1960s
 Bristol Phoebus, a prototype jet engine of 1949
 Captain Phoebus, a fictional character from The Hunchback of Notre Dame
 A nuclear thermal rocket engine developed in the 60s by Project Rover

See also
 Phobos (disambiguation)
 Phöbus, a literary journal
 Phoebe (disambiguation)
 Phoebis, a butterfly genus